The Grohl Sessions, Vol. 1 is an extended play which was released by the Zac Brown Band on December 10, 2013. Originally released only to digital retailers, it was physically released on May 19, 2014. The physical release includes a 45-minute DVD on the creation of the album. Included on the album is the single "All Alright", which was sent to radio on April 28, 2014.

Content
The Grohl Sessions, Vol. 1 is a four track extended play by the Zac Brown Band. Its four tracks are "Day for the Dead", "The Muse", "Let It Rain", and "All Alright".

In an interview with Rolling Stone, producer Dave Grohl stated, "They're unbelievable, the band is so good they can be tracked live; we didn't fuck with computers, we tracked live, four-part harmonies around one microphone. It's rocking. People are like, 'Oh, it's country.' 'No, it's not, it's like the Allman Brothers.' 'No, it's not, it's jam band.' I don't even know what you would call it, it's fucking great."

Critical reception

The album received universal acclaim upon its release, holding an average 87 out of 100 rating on Metacritic.

Track listing

Personnel
Compiled from liner notes.

Zac Brown Band
 Zac Brown – lead vocals, acoustic guitar, electric guitar
 Coy Bowles – slide guitar, Hammond organ
 Clay Cook – Hammond organ, Wurlitzer electric piano, clavinet, electric guitar
 Jimmy De Martini – fiddle, background vocals
 John Driskell Hopkins – acoustic guitar, electric guitar, background vocals
 Chris Fryar – drums except on "Let It Rain"
 Daniel de los Reyes – percussion

Guest musicians
Dave Grohl – drums on "Let It Rain"
Oteil Burbridge – bass guitar
A. J. Ghent – electric guitar solo on "All Alright"

Technical
Adam Ayan – mastering
Dave Grohl – production
Mike Fraser – engineering

Chart performance

Weekly charts

Year-end charts

References

2013 EPs
Zac Brown Band EPs
Albums produced by Dave Grohl
Country rock EPs